Sangão is a municipality in the state of Santa Catarina in the South region of Brazil. In January 2023, the municipality was struck by an F0/1 tornado.

See also
List of municipalities in Santa Catarina

References

Municipalities in Santa Catarina (state)